Financial Street Subdistrict is a subdistrict on the center of Xicheng District, Beijing, China. As of 2020, its total population is 54,849.

History

Administrative Division 

As of 2021, there are 20 communities within the subdistrict:

Landmarks 
 National Assembly Building
 Prince Chun Mansion

External links 
 Official website (Archived)

References 

Xicheng District
Subdistricts of Beijing